McCoy McLemore Jr. (April 3, 1942 – April 30, 2009) was an American professional basketball player in the 1960s and 1970s. He played college basketball for Drake University.

Basketball career

Early years 
Born in Houston, Texas, McLemore attended Houston's Jack Yates High School.

College 
McLemore first attended Moberly Area Community College, but then transferred to Drake University, leading his team to be co-Missouri Valley Conference champions. McLemore was inducted posthumously into the National Junior College Athletic Association Basketball Hall of Fame in 2011.

Professional career 
He was a third-round pick by the San Francisco Warriors in 1964. McLemore was a member of the Chicago Bulls' inaugural team after being selected in the 1966 expansion draft. Two years later, the Phoenix Suns drafted McLemore in the 1968 expansion draft. In the middle of the 1968 season, he was traded to the Detroit Pistons. 1970 marked the third time McLemore was selected in an expansion draft, this time by the Cleveland Cavaliers. The Cavailers then traded McLemore to the Milwaukee Bucks, where Eddie Doucette described him as "a good rebounder off the bench." The Bucks waived McLemore in November 1971, and the Houston Rockets signed him in December 1971. The Rockets did not renew his contract for the 1972 season.

NBA career statistics

Regular season

|-
| align="left" | 1964–65
| align="left" | San Francisco
| 78 || - || 22.2 || .337 || - || .714 || 6.3 || 1.0 || - || - || 8.3
|-
| align="left" | 1965–66
| align="left" | San Francisco
| style="background:#cfecec;"| 80* || - || 18.3 || .426 || - || .743 || 6.1 || 0.7 || - || - || 7.4
|-
| align="left" | 1966–67
| align="left" | Chicago
| 79 || - || 17.5 || .385 || - || .772 || 4.7 || 0.8 || - || - || 9.2
|-
| align="left" | 1967–68
| align="left" | Chicago
| 76 || - || 27.6 || .398 || - || .779 || 5.7 || 1.7 || - || - || 12.7
|-
| align="left" | 1968–69
| align="left" | Phoenix
| 31 || - || 22.9 || .385 || - || .773 || 5.4 || 1.6 || - || - || 11.8
|-
| align="left" | 1968–69
| align="left" | Detroit
| 50 || - || 18.2 || .396 || - || .808 || 4.7 || 0.9 || - || - || 7.3
|-
| align="left" | 1969–70
| align="left" | Detroit
| 73 || - || 19.5 || .466 || - || .821 || 4.6 || 1.1 || - || - || 8.0
|-
| align="left" | 1970–71
| align="left" | Cleveland
| 58 || - || 31.7 || .388 || - || .773 || 8.0 || 3.0 || - || - || 11.7
|-
| style="text-align:left;background:#afe6ba;"| 1970–71†
| align="left" | Milwaukee
| 28 || - || 14.8 || .368 || - || .829 || 3.8 || 1.1 || - || - || 4.7
|-
| align="left" | 1971–72
| align="left" | Milwaukee
| 10 || - || 9.9 || .321 || - || .917 || 3.4 || 1.2 || - || - || 2.9
|-
| align="left" | 1971–72
| align="left" | Houston
| 17 || - || 8.6 || .442 || - || .750 || 2.3 || 0.6 || - || - || 2.8
|- class="sortbottom"
| style="text-align:center;" colspan="2"| Career
| 580 || - || 21.1 || .394 || - || .771 || 5.5 || 1.3 || - || - || 8.8
|}

Playoffs

|-
| align="left" | 1966–67
| align="left" | Chicago
| 3 || - || 15.0 || .400 || - || .867 || 3.0 || 1.3 || - || - || 12.3
|-
| align="left" | 1967–68
| align="left" | Chicago
| 5 || - || 28.4 || .388 || - || .762 || 4.8 || 1.0 || - || - || 10.8
|-
| style="text-align:left;background:#afe6ba;" | 1970–71†
| align="left" | Milwaukee
| 10 || - || 5.2 || .250 || - || .500 || 1.6 || 0.8 || - || - || 0.7
|- class="sortbottom"
| style="text-align:center;" colspan="2"| Career
| 18 || - || 13.3 || .374 || - || .789 || 2.7 || 0.9 || - || - || 5.4
|}

Post-career life
McLemore was a color analyst in the late 1980s for Rockets' television broadcasts on Home Sports Entertainment.

Death
McLemore died of cancer, aged 67, on April 30, 2009.

References

External links
NBA stats at basketballreference.com
JC and College stats

1942 births
2009 deaths
American men's basketball players
Basketball players from Houston
Centers (basketball)
Chicago Bulls expansion draft picks
Chicago Bulls players
Cleveland Cavaliers expansion draft picks
Cleveland Cavaliers players
Deaths from cancer in Texas
Detroit Pistons players
Drake Bulldogs men's basketball players
Houston Rockets players
Milwaukee Bucks players
Moberly Greyhounds men's basketball players
Phoenix Suns expansion draft picks
Phoenix Suns players
Power forwards (basketball)
San Francisco Warriors draft picks
San Francisco Warriors players